"O Amar Desher Mati" (Bengali: ও আমার দেশের মাটি) is a Bengali patriotic song written by Rabindranath Tagore. It was written against the Partition of Bengal in 1905. Indira Debi Chowdhurani provided the notation of the song. This song was included in the book named "Shawdesh". It was composed in Pilu-Baul Raga and Dadra Taal.

Legacy 

The song inspired the Bengali fighters during the Liberation War of Bangladesh. Bengali revolutionary Krishnagopal Chowdhury sang this song on his way to death sentence given by the British Raj on charges of sedition in 1934. The song was used in the Bengali film Ora Egaro Jon directed by Chashi Nazrul Islam.

Synopsis 
The song recounts the narrative of the motherland's role as a nurturing entity towards her people, as well as the lamentable realization of their failure to reciprocate in kind.

References

External links 
 rabindra-rachanabali.nltr.org (Bengali)
 kotharsur.com (Bengali)

1905 songs
Bengali-language songs
Rabindra Sangeet
Songs written by Rabindranath Tagore
Indian patriotic songs


